Cory Ness is a second-generation American motorcycle designer and entrepreneur. He is the son of motorcycle customizer Arlen Ness, and father of Zach Ness.

Ness, following in his father's footsteps as a motorcycle enthusiast, became well known from his appearances on the Discovery Channel show Biker Build-Off in 2004 when he went head-to-head against his father and won. Ness appeared for a second time on the show in 2005, defeating Eric Gorges.

External links
 Cory Ness bio, motorcycle-usa.com
 Cory Ness interview, motorcycle-usa.com
 Diggin’ It | 2010 Cory Ness Digger, hotbikeweb.com
 Biker Build-Off Cory Ness vs. Arlen Ness, YouTube

Living people
People from San Leandro, California
Motorcycle builders
Motorcycle designers
1963 births